Oksana Baulina (November 1, 1979 - March 23, 2022) was a Russian journalist killed working for investigative outfit The Insider in Kyiv during the 2022 Russian Invasion of Ukraine. She had official accreditation from the Ukrainian armed forces and died during a mortar strike on a shopping center. Another civilian was killed in the same attack, and two others were injured. 

Baulina, once a fashion editor at Time Out Moscow, became an activist with Alexei Navalny's Anti-Corruption Foundation in 2016. She emigrated to Poland shortly before the organization was branded extremist by the Russian government. Before the Russian invasion of Ukraine, she was based in Warsaw, and during the invasion had reported from Kyiv and Lviv. Her final work included interviews with Russian prisoners of war, whom she let call home using her cell phone.

References

1979 births
2022 deaths
Russian journalists
Journalists killed while covering the 2022 Russian invasion of Ukraine